Master Saleem also known as Saleem Shahzada is an Indian singer who is known for his work as a devotional singer and also as a playback singer in Bollywood films, like Heyy Babyy (2007), Dostana and Love Aaj Kal (2009). He has also released several private albums of Punjabi Music and Sufi music.

Early life and training
Master Saleem was born as Saleem  (Saleem Shahzada), in Shahkot, near Jalandhar, Punjab He is the son of the famous Sufi singer Ustad Puran Shah Koti, who was also the guru of folk singers, Hans Raj Hans, Jasbir Jassi, Sabar Koti and Diljaan. At the age of six Saleem also became his disciple and started learning singing.

Career
At the age of seven, he gave his first public performance at the opening ceremony of Bathinda Doordarshan (TV station), with his song, Charkhe Di Ghook, and thus earned the name Master Saleem. Soon he started appearing on TV shows like, Jhilmil Taare.

Saleem's first album, Charkhe Di Ghook, was released when he was 10 years old. It was released on the label Sur Taal, created by his father's friend, Manjinder Singh Goli, and went on to become a hit. This led to several Punjabi music and religious albums and live shows. His song Dhol Jagiro Da also became a huge hit and giving him wide popularity. In the late 1990s, however as he was growing his voice started changing, which lessened his popularity. He made his comeback in 2000, with the Sufi number Aj Hona Deedar Mahi da, which he sang at a New Year's programme at Doordarshan channel, and later released albums dedicated to Goddess Durga including, Mela Maiya Da (2004), Aj Hai Jagrata, Meri Maiya and Darshan Kar Lao.

Around 2005, singer Jasbir Jassi introduced him to music director Sandeep Chowta, who subsequently called him to Delhi to record single Sajni in Sony Music album Teri Sajni.

Eventually Shankar Mahadevan, of the music trio Shankar–Ehsaan–Loy, heard his performances at a jagaran at the Devi Talaab Mandir, Jalandhar, being aired on a religious TV channel, and thus Saleem made his debut as playback singer with single "Mast Kalandar" from the film Heyy Babyy (2007) under their music direction. The song was a hit and launched his Bollywood career. This was followed by most well-known singles including "Tashan Mein" from the film Tashan and Maa Da Ladla from the film Dostana (2008), and Aahun Aahun in Love Aaj Kal (2009). and in 2010 some of his hit songs have been "Humka Peeni Hai" from "Dabangg and "Shakira" in "No Problem and "Chamki Jawani" in Yamla Pagla Deewana. In 2011 one of his first hits was "Rola Pe Gaya" in Patiala House.

Television

Filmography

Discography

Music albums

Tracks on compilations
 2009 : Sajni, Teri Sajni (Sony BMG)
 2010 : Nach Ke Vikha, Jhanjar Chanak Payee (Speed Records)
 2011 : Tu Hi Tu, Star Plus Anthem
 2014 : Bhagat Singh – Single (Dharam Seva Records)

Devotional albums
 2006 Mela Maiya Da (T-Series)
 2007 : Aaj Hai Jagrata (T-Series)
 2009 : Guru Ravidass Ji Di Bani (T-Series)
 2009 : Shiv Mere
 2009 : jai jai kaar(T-Series)
 2010 : Darshan Kanshi Wale Da (T-Series)
 2010 : Maa Meharan Kardi (T-Series)
 2010 : Shiv Bhole Bhandari (T-Series)
 2010 : Singh Jaikare Bolde (T-Series)
 2011 : Chal re Kanwariya(Jai Bala Music)
 2016 : Bholey Di Baraat

Singles

References

Master Saleem Information

External links
 Master Saleem, Official website
 

1980 births
Living people
Indian male playback singers
Indian male folk singers
Bollywood playback singers
People from Jalandhar
Performers of Hindu music
Punjabi-language singers
Telugu playback singers
Kannada playback singers
21st-century Indian singers
Singers from Punjab, India
21st-century Indian male singers